Hall Island is an island of the Russian Arctic archipelago of Franz Josef Land.

History 
Hall Island was discovered on 30 August 1873, by the Austro-Hungarian North Pole expedition, and named after American Arctic explorer Charles Francis Hall. It was the first island of the Franz Josef group which the expedition discovered and, after the smaller Wilczeck Island, the first major island on which they set foot.

A small camp was built at Cape Tegethoff in 1898 by the Walter Wellman expedition. It contains a marker commemorating the discovery of the archipelago. Cape Tegetthoff was named after the main ship of the Austro-Hungarian explorers, which had been named in honor of Austrian admiral Wilhelm von Tegetthoff.

Geography 

Hall Island is almost completely covered by glaciers. Besides the ice dome there is a glacier with its terminus in the southern shore, the Sonklar Glacier.

The only relatively large areas free of permanent ice are located in its southern end, where there are two headlands, Cape Tegetthoff, and also Cape Ozernyy, on Littrov Peninsula. There is also a very small unglaciated area around its eastern cape, Mys Frankfurt, and another in its northwestern point, Cape Wiggins. There is a wide bay on the southeastern side of Hall Island known as Hydrographer Bay and a smaller one west of the Littrov Peninsula called Bukhta Surovaya.

Hall Island is located very close to the eastern shores of McClintock Island, separated from it by a narrow sound. To the southeast there is a wider strait separating Hall Island from Salm Island known in Russian as Proliv Lavrova. The strait to the east is the large Avstriskiy Proliv.

Adjacent minor islands 
  Berghaus Island
It is named after German geographer Heinrich Berghaus.
  Brownian Islands
 Comprising three small island off Hall Island's northern shore, this group of islands are named after Russian geographer and meteorologist Peter Ivanovich Brownov.
  Newcomb Island
It is named after Canadian-American polymath Simon Newcomb.

See also 
 List of islands of Russia

References 

Islands of Arkhangelsk Oblast
Islands of Franz Josef Land